Huntington is a town in Chittenden County, Vermont, United States. The population was 1,938 at the 2020 census.

History
The town was originally called "New Huntington", but the name was changed to "Huntington" in October 1795. It was named for landholders Josiah, Charles and Marmaduke Hunt.

Geography
Huntington is in southeastern Chittenden County, bordered to the southwest by Addison County and to the east by Washington County. The town is located on the west side of the Green Mountains and is centered on the valley of the Huntington River, a north-flowing tributary of the Winooski River. The  summit of Camel's Hump is in Huntington's northeast corner, on the town boundary with Duxbury.

The village of Huntington is in the northwest part of the town, Huntington Center is centrally located, and Hanksville is in the south. All three villages lie along the Huntington River.

Demographics
As of the census of 2000, there were 1,861 people, 692 households, and 512 families residing in the town.  The population density was 48.8 people per square mile (18.8/km2).  There were 744 housing units at an average density of 19.5 per square mile (7.5/km2).  The racial makeup of the town was 97.47% White, 0.38% African American, 0.16% Native American, 0.48% Asian, 0.16% from other races, and 1.34% from two or more races. Hispanic or Latino of any race were 0.38% of the population.

There were 692 households, out of which 40.0% had children under the age of 18 living with them, 65.0% were married couples living together, 5.9% had a female householder with no husband present, and 26.0% were non-families. 16.9% of all households were made up of individuals, and 3.8% had someone living alone who was 65 years of age or older.  The average household size was 2.68 and the average family size was 3.09.

In the town, the population was spread out, with 28.3% under the age of 18, 4.6% from 18 to 24, 37.0% from 25 to 44, 24.7% from 45 to 64, and 5.4% who were 65 years of age or older.  The median age was 37 years. For every 100 females, there were 98.6 males.  For every 100 females age 18 and over, there were 99.4 males.

The median income for a household in the town was $49,559, and the median income for a family was $52,269. Males had a median income of $32,794 versus $26,420 for females. The per capita income for the town was $20,402.  About 5.1% of families and 6.0% of the population were below the poverty line, including 7.9% of those under age 18 and 17.4% of those age 65 or over.

Climate
This climatic region is typified by large seasonal temperature differences, with warm to hot (and often humid) summers and cold (sometimes severely cold) winters.  According to the Köppen Climate Classification system, Huntington has a humid continental climate, abbreviated "Dfb" on climate maps.

Education

Mount Mansfield Modified Union School District operates the community's public schools.

When MMUUSD formed, Huntington residents had representation as the community sent its secondary students there, but Huntington continued to have its own elementary school district. Residents of Huntington resisted merging that district for a longer time, with four unsuccessful votes on merging into MMUUSD. At one point the state of Vermont passed Act 46 that obligated school districts to merge. The Huntington School District sued the state government to try to stop the merger. In 2018 the Huntington district filed its third lawsuit against mergers. On June 6, 2019, the vote to merge Huntington into Mount Mansfield succeeded on a 450–191 basis; the Chittenden East Supervisory Union dissolved as a result.

Notable people

 Gregory C. Knight, Adjutant general of the Vermont National Guard beginning in March 2019
 Emerson H. Liscum, U.S. Army officer
 Sandy and Caroline Paton, folk musicians and folklorists, founded Folk-Legacy Records in Huntington, VT in 1961 
 Bob Spear, naturalist, birdwatcher, founder of the Birds of Vermont Museum
 Damon Wayans Jr., actor, comedian, and writer

References

External links
 Town of Huntington official website

 
Towns in Vermont
Burlington, Vermont metropolitan area
Towns in Chittenden County, Vermont